Central FM is an English commercial radio station broadcasting in Southern Spain. There are other English stations broadcasting over a similar area on the Costa del Sol.

History

Current Presenters
 Tony Keys
 Nataly Garcia
 Andy Little
 Lynn Halliday
 Sean Swaby 
 Mike Whittingham
 Geoff Jameson
 Paul Breen Turner
 Cath John
 Baz Williamson
 Dave Englefield
 Spencer James

References

External links
Official website

Radio stations in Spain